Intel Rapid Storage Technology (RST) is a driver SATA AHCI and a firmware-based RAID solution built into a wide range of Intel chipsets.
Currently also is installed as a driver for Intel Optane temporary storage units.

It contains two operation modes that do not follow the SATA standard, it follows two Intel specific modes.
The name modes and the application that contains them have been renamed since the first version.
Until 2010 it contains AHCI and Matrix RAID modes. The first mode is the Intel driver SATA normal and the latter mode is a fake RAID.
Up to version 4 it is included on Intel Application Accelerator RAID Edition, between versions 5 and 8.9 it is included on Intel Matrix Storage Manager (IMSM), since version 9 it is included on Intel Rapid Storage Technology (IRST) preferring the driver modes to be named RST AHCI and RST AHCI RAID instead of Matrix RAID. The latter is also known as RST RAID mode, since it is the mode that Intel recommends to use, even if you are not working with a RAID configuration.
The purpose of the program, after installing the drivers, is to configure the operation in this mode.

Both modes work with SATA drives. The boot mode choice, with one mode or the other, is chosen in modern BIOS/UEFI after driver installation. Once one or the other driver is installed, it is not possible for the Windows operating system to boot again with the BIOS/UEFI set to RAID/IDE, producing BSOD in case of trying.

As of 2020, it includes a RAID system capable of RAID levels 0, 1, 5, and 10, a block level SSD caching accelerator ("Smart Response Technology") with support for write-back and write-through modes for speed or data protection of any disk or RAID array, and support for intelligent caching, speedy recovery from certain issues, and for PCI Express based drives. Intel RST came in two variants, RST for desktops, and RSTe for enterprise scenarios, although for many chipsets, the user could choose as both variants will operate correctly. VROC was a part of Intel RSTe. The SATA RAID portion of the product family was called Intel RSTe and the NVMe* RAID portion was called Intel VROC. However, starting in Q1 2019, with the launch of Intel VROC 6.0, the Intel RSTe name was removed, and all RAID solutions in this product family were branded as Intel VROC. The SATA functionality remains, but is now branded as Intel VROC (SATA RAID). Intel RSTe is no longer a referenced product by Intel. The name may still appear in some legacy products, but all new references will solely use the Intel VROC nomenclature.).

Intel RST is provided by a combination of firmware, chipset and CPU capabilities, and software. As such, the chipset, the firmware included in the BIOS, and the software installed by the user, must be compatible versions. Online forums and communities exist which compare the benefits of different versions of these, advise as to best compatibility for specified hardware, and modify existing firmware and software to allow optimal combinations or updates beyond those provided by the hardware manufacturers.

Like all RAID (Redundant Array of Independent Disks), Intel RST RAID employs two or more physical hard disks which the operating system will treat as a single disk, in order to increase redundancy which avoids data loss (except RAID 0), and/or to increase the speed at which data is written to and/or read from a disk. Intel RST RAID does not provide new RAID levels. It allows different areas (e.g. partitions or logical volumes) on the same disk to be assigned to different RAID devices, unlike some other RAID controllers. Intel recommends to put any critical applications and data on a RAID 1, 5, or 10 volume, with redundancy to protect against data loss. The RAID 0 volume in Matrix RAID provides fast access to large files where data loss is not a critical issue but speed is; examples include video editing, swap files, and files that are backed up. Intel Matrix RAID, Intel Rapid RAID, and Intel Smart Response Technology are together described as Intel Rapid Storage Technology.

Operating system support
"Rapid Storage Technology" (RST), including creation of RAID volumes, works under Windows 7 and newer versions of Microsoft Windows. The older "Intel Matrix RAID" is supported under Microsoft Windows XP.

Linux supports Matrix RAID and Rapid Storage Technology (RST) through device mapper, with  tool, for RAID 0, 1 and 10. And Linux MD RAID, with  tool, for RAID 0, 1, 10, and 5. Set up of the RAID volumes must be done by using the ROM option in the Matrix Storage Manager, then further configuration can be done in DM-RAID or MD-RAID.

FreeBSD and MidnightBSD support Intel Matrix RAID using the "ataraid" driver, managed through the atacontrol command. However, with older versions of FreeBSD there were critical reliability issues which include array device renaming when a disk in an array is replaced, an array being considered healthy if the machine reboot/crashes during an array rebuild, and kernel panics when a disk is lost or is removed from the bus. Some of these problems, when experienced in combination, could result in the loss of an entire array (even in the case of RAID 1).

VMware ESXi 4 does not support any RAID function nor Intel Matrix RAID based on Intel ICHxR controllers.

PGPDisk does not support Intel Matrix RAID based on Intel ICHxR, and does not support standalone drives if the "RAID" mode is enabled on the motherboard.

Matrix Storage Manager option ROM
The Intel Matrix Storage Manager (IMSM) option ROM is a part of Matrix RAID that has to be used in the BIOS to create new RAID arrays.
 Intel uses "Rapid Storage Technology" -"Option Rom"- on its new chipsets, dropping the "Matrix" name.
An Intel document notes that Intel Matrix Storage Manager storage changed to Intel Rapid Storage Technology beginning with version 9.5.

There have been several driver versions:

Since release 11.2.0.0000, TRIM commands can be read by Windows RAID drivers made for 7 series chipsets. There is no RAID mode TRIM support on drivers for older chipsets.

Intel states that RST support was added for the X79 chipset in RST version 11.6.0.0000 and after.

On some 6 series chipsets there is a modification for the ROM in the BIOS, which will allow TRIM support on the 6 series chipset.

For the X79 chipset, certain motherboard manufacturers have added both RAID ROMs in the BIOS, the RST and RST-E ROM. X79 is the Enterprise version, called RST-E. With the RST ROM added to the BIOS, this allows TRIM function to pass through the controller and TRIM SSD drives when RAID is enabled. This workaround was needed before RST-E driver version 3.8 was shipped which passed through TRIM commands to a RAID array without modifications to the RST-E ROM. There is no support for TRIM in the RST-E version of the ROM when RAID is enabled and the RST-E driver version is less than 3.8. It is possible to add an RST ROM to the BIOS to enable TRIM passthrough in RAID mode by using the RST ROM and driver.

The newest Option ROM version is a 13 series ROM, this ROM will not be used by motherboard manufacturers for the X79 chipset BIOS, and it can be injected into a BIOS to use on the X79 with modded code, for those MFG's who have added a ROM switch, this is where the MFG has added both RST and RSTe to the RAID option of a BIOS, but there needs to be a code added for TRIM commands to be sent, when you inject the RST and replace the RSTe with RST option ROM in X79 boards that do not contain the ROM switch, TRIM can be dysfunctional.

There are modded RST 13 series Option ROMs (legacy) available at certain BIOS modding sites that have been made functional for use in the X79 chipsets.

When booting in a BIOS environment (legacy) and some / EFI, the RST option ROM is used. When booting in a true UEFI environment the Option ROM is not used as a SataDriver with the RST version takes over. In BIOS mode the legacy/BIOS booting is under CSMCORE. In true UEFI mode the RST is controlled under SataDriver in BIOS.

The Intel RAID ROM is the firmware in the motherboard BIOS that is used to create the RAID array.

Note: The RST drivers can be used for RAID and also on a single drive as it contains an AHCI driver. There is a bug in the version 12.5.0.1066 RST driver, which cause TRIM commands not to pass through the RAID driver to the drives. TRIM is disabled using this driver.

Rapid Storage Technology enterprise (Intel RSTe)
Intel Rapid Storage Technology enterprise (Intel RSTe) provides performance and reliability for supported systems equipped with Serial ATA (SATA) devices, Serial Attached SCSI (SAS) devices, and/or solid state drives (SSDs) to enable an optimal enterprise storage solution.
The main difference between RST and RSTe is that the RST is used for desktop systems and the RSTe is mostly used for server systems.
RST supports regular SATA controllers from desktop systems.

If the BIOS of the motherboard has RSTe feature then the user cannot install Intel Rapid Storage Technology software (error message: This platform is not supported). The user has to install RSTe software.

There have been several Option ROM versions:

In 2019, Intel announced that the RTSe branding would be replaced, with RSTe consolidated into Intel's VROC (Virtual RAID on CPU) product line.

Intel VROC (Virtual RAID on CPU)

Intel VROC is a part of Intel RSTe. This was mostly designed with NVMe SSD's in mind and it is directly attached to the Intel Xeon Scalable processors. For the full functionality it uses a newer Intel technology called Intel VMD (Intel Volume Management Device). 
Intel VROC is a technology from the Intel Xeon Scalable processors series and is used to provide hot-plug, surprise-removal, and LED management of NVMe SSD's for server usage. For client PC's Intel RST is still the advised software package to use.
Intel VMD is targeted for Microsoft Windows and Linux operating systems.

Criticism on Intel RST technology
The software created by Intel to manage the RAID configuration is under par.

E.g. when using a RAID 1 configuration, Windows shall show a temporary message when one of the disk are down, however if this is not noticed (because the user is not at the computer), the user might not notice the disk failure in time.

Furthermore the Intel RST software does not consistently log status changes (repair/rebuilds) in the Windows Eventlog, making it difficult for 3rd party monitoring software to warn users when the RAID status changes and the data might be in jeopardy.

Other strange decision Intel has made, is to remove the e-mail warning from the latest version (v19.x) of the software. On earlier versions (18.x) the e-mail warning can be configured, but lacks the modern fields like password and SSL/TLS authentication to be used with modern e-mail providers like Gmail, Microsoft's Outlook and e-mail accounts from other providers.

Also when field tested (with an older mail server *without authentication*), no warnings were e-mailed. This e-mail service was also inconsistent because the disk degradation was not e-mailed, but consequently the finished rebuild of the RAID was e-mailed, without the user ever being warned the computer was rebuilding the RAID drive.

Intel also used to have a command line software (CLI) for their RST RAID, which one could use to request the status of the RAID drives, however this software was deprecated.

The conclusion might be made that Intel is deliberately undermining the reliability of the RAID, by crippling the methods to warn the user before data is lost.

See also
Non-standard RAID levels
mdadm

References

External links

https://win-raid.com - forum specializing in Intel RST and similar soft raid, choice of driver/rom/orom, and modification of roms.

RAID
AT Attachment
Matrix RAID
Matrix RAID